Uzun Darreh-ye Olya (also Romanized as Ūzūn Darreh-ye ‘Olyā; also known as Ūzondarreh ‘Olyā, Ūzūn Darreh, Ūzūn Darreh Bālā, Ūzūn Darreh-ye Bālā, and Uzur Darreh) is a village in Akhtachi-ye Gharbi Rural District, in the Central District of Mahabad County, West Azerbaijan Province, Iran. At the 2006 census, its population was 173, in 22 families.

References 

Populated places in Mahabad County